Lord Murphy (1876 – after 1881) was an American thoroughbred racehorse that was bred in Tennessee and is best known for winning the 1879 Kentucky Derby. He was originally named Patmus and was a grandson of Lexington. He descended from the Byerly Turk.

The 5th Kentucky Derby was run on a fast track with a field of nine horses, including the notable racer and future leading sire Falsetto. Lord Murphy was knocked almost to his knees by Ada Glenn on the first turn, but managed to pull himself up from 7th to 1st place at the mile marker to win over the fast approaching Falsetto.

Lord Murphy was bought soon after his Derby win by horseman James R. Keene, who promptly shipped him overseas to the British racing circuit. His arrival was greeted with interest in Britain, as he was "purely American", rather than being bred from relatively recent European exports. Lord Murphy did not race well in Britain, being unplaced in the 1880 Chatsworth Handicap Plate at Derby and the 1881 Visitors Plate run at the Craven meeting. He acquired a "savage" temper and became a "roarer", an ailment that Keene thought developed secondary to the change in weather between the United States and England. Keene sold Lord Murphy to Richard Ten Broeck in May 1881. He was later sold at a British public auction in Newmarket on July 6, 1881, the horse fetching a small sum of 10 guineas ($50).

Pedigree

References

1876 racehorse births
Racehorses bred in Tennessee
Racehorses trained in the United States
Kentucky Derby winners
Thoroughbred family A10
Byerley Turk sire line